A loading screen is a screen shown by a computer program, very often a video game, while the program is loading (moving program data from the disk to RAM) or initializing.

In early video games, the loading screen was also a chance for graphic artists to be creative without the technical limitations often required for the in-game graphics. Drawing utilities were also limited during this period. Melbourne Draw, one of the few 8-bit screen utilities with a zoom function, was one program of choice for artists.

While loading screens remain commonplace in video games, background loading is now used in many games, especially open world titles, to eliminate loading screens while traversing normally through the game, making them appear only when "teleporting" farther than the load distance (e.g. using warps or fast travel) or moving faster than the game can load.

Loading times 
Loading screens that disguise the length of time that a program takes to load were common when computer games were loaded from cassette tape, a process which could take five minutes or more. Nowadays, most games are downloaded digitally, and therefore loaded off the hard drive meaning faster load times; however, some games are also loaded off of an optical disc, faster than previous magnetic media, but still include loading screens to disguise the amount of time taken to initialize the game in RAM.

Because the loading screen data itself needs to be read from the media, it actually can increase the overall loading time. For example, with a ZX Spectrum game, the screen data takes up 6 kilobytes, representing an increase in loading time of about 13% over the same game without a loading screen. Recently, however, more powerful hardware has significantly diminished this effect.

Variations 

The loading screen does not need to be a static picture. Some loading screens display a progress bar or a timer countdown to show how much data has actually loaded. Others, recently, are not even a picture at all, and are a small video or have parts animated in real time.

Other loading screens double as briefing screens, providing the user with information to read. This information may only be there for storytelling and/or entertainment or it can give the user information that is usable when the loading is complete, for example the mission goals in a game. In fighting games the loading screen is often a versus screen, which shows the fighters who will take part in the match.

Minigames 
Some games have even included minigames in their loading screen, notably the 1983 Skyline Attack for the Commodore 64 and Joe Blade 2 on the ZX Spectrum.
One well-known loader game was Invade-a-Load. Another example is "the shop keepers quiz" in Dota 2 which is more like a game finding screen rather than loading screen.

Namco has used playable mini-games during a loading screen. Examples include variations of their old arcade games (Galaxian or Rally-X or for example) as loading screens when first booting up many of their early PlayStation releases. Even to this day, their PlayStation 2 games, like Tekken 5, still use the games to keep people busy while the game initially boots up. Despite the Invade-a-Load prior art, Namco filed a patent in 1995 that prevented other companies from having playable mini-games on their loading screens, which expired in 2015.
Recent EA Sports games have "warm up" sessions. For example, FIFA 11 has the player shooting free-kicks solo and NBA Live 10 has 2-player shootouts, while the game loads. NBA Live 08 features a 4-player general knowledge quiz. The PlayStation 3 and Xbox 360 versions of THQ's MX vs. ATV: Untamed lets the player partake in a free-ride session on the test course.

Videos 
Some games like a number of Call of Duty titles have videos that give an introduction to the level while the game loads in the background. Normally, when the level is completely loaded, the remaining video can be skipped. The video does not necessarily apply to what is happening in the level, as Red Faction: Guerrilla sometimes shows news reports foreshadowing events that will become important later on, or that give tidbits about the game's universe.

Music 
On the Commodore 64, tape loading screens would often feature music in the form of a chiptune making use of the machine's advanced SID sound chip.

See also 
 Splash screen
 Title screen

References 

Graphical user interface elements
Video game design